Thomaston, formerly known as Fort St. Georges, 'Fort Wharf, and Lincoln, is a town in Knox County, Maine. The population was 2,739 at the 2020 census. Noted for its antique architecture, Thomaston is an old port popular with tourists.  The town was named after Major General John Thomas.

History
As early as 1630, a trading post was established on the eastern bank of the St. George River, then considered the boundary between New England and New France. In 1704, Thomas LeFebvre from Quebec bought a large tract of land along the Weskeag River on which he built a gristmill, with a house on the shoreline at what is now South Thomaston. The area became known as Thomas' Town. In 1719–1720, the old trading post was remodeled into Fort St. George, a stockaded fort protected by two blockhouses. But Abenaki Indian tribes protested the encroachment of an English fort on their territory. Instigated by the French, they attacked the garrison twice during Dummer's War in 1722, then again in 1723 with a siege lasting 30 days. In response to this and other provocations, soldiers destroyed the Abenaki stronghold of Norridgewock in 1724.

During the French and Indian War, to avenge for the fall of Louisbourg, on August 13, 1758, French officer Boishebert left Miramichi, New Brunswick with 400 soldiers for Fort St George in Thomaston. His detachment reached there on September 9 but was caught in an ambush and had to withdraw. This was Boishébert's last Acadian expedition. They then went on to raid Friendship, Maine, where people were killed and others taken prisoner. Hostilities of the French and Indian Wars ceased with the 1759 Fall of Quebec.

Mason Wheaton was the first permanent settler in 1763. Located at the heart of the Waldo Patent, Thomaston was incorporated from St. Georges Plantation on March 20, 1777. Many settlers arrived following the Revolutionary War in 1783. General Henry Knox built his mansion, Montpelier, at Thomaston in 1793–1794.

The town prospered in the early 19th century as a port and ship building center. Around 1840, two of seven recorded millionaires in the United States were Thomaston sea captains. Other industries included two gristmills, two sawmills and planing mills, three sail lofts, brickyards, cask manufacturing and a marble works. Lime had been manufactured here since 1734 in kilns. 
Thomaston is still home to Jeff's Marine, Inc. and Lyman Morse Boatbuilding, builders of custom power and sailing yachts. Located on St. George River, Lyman Morse Boatbuilding sits on the original site of the General Henry Knox Mansion, where wooden schooners have been built for over 200 years.

Rockland and South Thomaston were set off and incorporated in 1848. The Knox and Lincoln Railroad passed through the town, carrying freight and tourists.

In June 1875, Louis Wagner, "the Smuttynose Axe Murderer, and John True Gordon, known as the Thorndike Slayer, were hanged on the gallows of Maine State Prison of Thomaston. Louis Wagner was forgotten by history until the recent book Return to Smuttynose Island and other Maine Axe Murders by Emeric Spooner. Mr. Spooner located Wagner's grave which can still be viewed in the Old Prison Cemetery on the grounds of the former prison.

Thomaston was home to the Maine State Prison until 2002, when it moved to Warren and the former facility was demolished. The prison was locally famous for its shop featuring handmade wares of the prisoners and was the inspiration for the prison in the film, The Shawshank Redemption. The gift shop still exists today. The prison site had been sold to the state in 1824 by former governor William King. Today, Thomaston is a resort area with a large historic district containing Federal, Greek Revival and Italianate architecture. The town was a filming location for the 1996 film, Thinner.

In 1974, Thomaston Historic District was listed on the National Register of Historic Places.

Geography
Thomaston is drained by the St. George River, Weskeag River, Mill River and Oyster River.

The town is crossed by U. S. Route 1 and Maine State Route 131. It is bordered by the towns of Rockland to the northeast, South Thomaston to the south, Cushing to the southwest, and Warren to the northwest.

Demographics

2010 census

As of the census of 2010, there were 2,781 people, 1,219 households, and 767 families residing in the town. The racial makeup of the town was 97.0% White, 0.3% African American, 0.5% Native American, 0.8% Asian, 0.1% from other races, and 1.4% from two or more races. Hispanic or Latino of any race were 0.5% of the population.

There were 1,219 households, of which 28.6% had children under the age of 18 living with them, 45.6% were married couples living together, 13.4% had a female householder with no husband present, 3.9% had a male householder with no wife present, and 37.1% were non-families. 30.4% of all households were made up of individuals, and 14% had someone living alone who was 65 years of age or older. The average household size was 2.25 and the average family size was 2.73.

The median age in the town was 44 years. 21.1% of residents were under the age of 18; 6.7% were between the ages of 18 and 24; 23.4% were from 25 to 44; 30.8% were from 45 to 64; and 18.1% were 65 years of age or older. The gender makeup of the town was 46.9% male and 53.1% female.

Fire Department
The Fire Department currently runs three pumpers, one ladder truck with a 75' aerial ladder, one utility/brush truck and one ambulance. The Fire Department is an all volunteer service.

Sites of interest
 Maine Watercraft Museum
 Montpelier – General Henry Knox Museum
 Thomaston Historical Society & Museum

Notable people 

 Adelyn Bushnell, author
 Jonathan Cilley, U.S. Congressman
 Benjamin S. Deane, architect
 Nathan A. Farwell, businessman and U.S. Senator
 Anna Parker Fessenden, botanist and math educator
 Samuel C. Fessenden, pastor and U.S. Congressman
 Charles Ranlett Flint, businessman, founder of IBM computer corporation
 Henry Knox, general and U.S. Secretary of War
 Laura Koffman, actress
 Norman Wallace Lermond, political activist and naturalist
 Joshua A. Lowell, U.S. Congressman
 Charles Copeland Morse, businessman
 Chris Rector, Maine state senator 
 Edward Robinson, U.S. Congressman
 Daniel Rose, 4th governor of Maine
 John Ruggles, U.S. Senator
 Henry K. Thatcher, Civil War admiral
 Peleg Wadsworth, Revolutionary War-era general
 Oliver Patterson Watts, educator

References

External links

Town of Thomaston, Maine
 Thomaston Public Library
 Maine Genealogy: Thomaston, Knox County, Maine
 Site to purchase the article "The Architecture of Thomaston, Maine" by Samuel M. Green, Journal of the Society of Architectural Historians Vol. 10, No. 4 (Dec., 1951), pp. 24–32

Populated coastal places in Maine
 
Lime kilns in the United States
Towns in Knox County, Maine
Towns in Maine